İbrahim Emet (born January 15, 1986 in Ankara) is a Turkish volleyball player. Standing 210 cm, he has played for the Develi Belediyespor  since the start of the 2022 season. He also played 75 times for national team.

External links
Player profile at galatasaray.org

1986 births
Living people
Sportspeople from Ankara
Turkish men's volleyball players
Sosyal Güvenlik Kurumu volleyballers
Galatasaray S.K. (men's volleyball) players
Volleyball players at the 2015 European Games
European Games competitors for Turkey
21st-century Turkish people